The Zunfthaus zur Zimmerleuten at the Limmatquai promenade in Zürich, Switzerland, situated between Münsterbrücke and Rathausbrücke, is the guild house of the Zunft zur Zimmerleuten, meaning the guild of the carpenters. Neighboured by the Saffran, Kämbel and Rüden guild houses, it is one of the city's historically notable buildings. The building also houses the relatively expensive restaurant of the same name.

History 
The guild house was built in the 14th century as a representative building of the Zunft zur Zimmerleuten on the Limmat river's right hand (downstream) shore in the today's Rathaus quarter, in the immediate neighborhood of the Grossmünster church, the Rathaus Zürich and the Haus zum Rüden, being then the most important buildings in Zürich. The guild house was first mentioned in a document dated 1416 AD.

In 2007 the building was partially destroyed by a fire, renovated and re-opened in 2010.

Cultural heritage 
The building is listed in the Swiss inventory of cultural property of national and regional significance as a Class A object.

Literature 
 Markus Brühlmeier, Beat Frei: Das Zürcher Zunftwesen. Verlag Neue Zürcher Zeitung, Zürich 2005. .

References

External links 

 

Altstadt (Zürich)
Guild houses in Zürich
Cultural property of national significance in the canton of Zürich
Ceramics museums
Restaurants in Zürich